The Colombian Open is a squash tournament held in Bogota, Colombia in August. It is part of the PSA World Tour. The event was first held in 1995.

Past Results

Men's

References

External links
Colombia Open Official Website
PSA Colombia Open 2013
2012 Colombia Open Squashsite page

 
Sport in Colombia